New Garden or Newgarden may refer to:

Places
In the United States
New Garden, Missouri, an unincorporated community
New Garden, Ohio
New Garden Township, Wayne County, Indiana
New Garden Township, Chester County, Pennsylvania
New Garden Airport, in Pennsylvania

Elsewhere
New Garden, Potsdam, a park in Potsdam, Germany

People
Josef Newgarden
Mark Newgarden
Paul Newgarden